The HRCS2 Hyundai Rotem is a dual-voltage electric multiple unit built by Hyundai Rotem for the Ukrainian Railways.

History 
The trains were ordered by Ukrainian Railways in preparation for the football championship UEFA Euro 2012 to transport passengers between cities that would host sporting events. The contract included delivery of 10 multiple units for $307 million, and an option for four diesel trains for an additional $43 million. As one of the consequence of Russian and soviet rule the Ukrainian rail network has a track gauge 85mm wider than the standard gauge, which requires purpose-built rolling stock. The South Korean trains were delivered by ship to Odesa on March 11, 2012. Unit HRCS2-002 was taken into service at Odesa Zastava-1 and sent to Kharkiv on March 16 for acceptance testing, followed by Unit -001 on March 17. Units -003 and -004 arrived in the port of Odessa on April 9, 2012, and were delivered to Kharkiv in April 2012, followed by units -005 and -006 in May. All six units had passed their acceptance tests by June 1, 2012, the remaining four trains followed until August 2012.

The trains are used on a premium service introduced in Ukraine specifically for them, called Intercity and Intercity+.

The trains had not undergone full-scale four-season tests, as is usually done in the railway sector. In December 2012 the trains broke down on a daily basis, due to the cold weather. This led to criticism by passengers and President of Ukraine Viktor Yanukovych that the trains were bought. Hyundai Rotem offered its apologies to Ukrainian passengers, citing its "first winter in the country". The company will have its own team of engineers in Ukraine till 2018. Early October 2013 the company guaranteed "continuous operation" of the Intercity+ trains in the coming autumn and winter. However, all trains were taken out of service on February 12, 2014. Service resumed with one train set on April 29, 2014. As of August 23, 2015, all HRCS2 trains have Wi-Fi access on board.

Description 
In service, the trains reach speeds of 160 km/h.

Each trailer car uses two asymmetric collectors manufactured by LEKOV and has one main transformer; each transformer feeds traction power to the two adjacent cars.

Each motor car has four asynchronous traction motors with a rated power of 250 kW (connected as four parallel groups) that are powered by 4QS converter and inverter.

The train uses an air suspension system.

Composition 
The trainset is formed with two cab cars, three trailers, and four power cars under the scheme: CC+T+P+P+T+P+P+T+CC, a shorter six car variant is also possible. Two units can be connected together to form a single train. The trailer cars carry first class seats in a 2x2 arrangement, the power cars and cab cars carry second class in a 2+3 seats arrangement. The total capacity of a single trainset is 579 passengers.

In-service use 
The Electric Multiple Unit is operated on the Lviv, Southwestern, Southern, Donetsk, and Cisdnieper railways.

Trains ran daily on the following routes:
 Kyiv-Kharkiv
 Darnytsia-Kyiv-Lviv
 Kyiv-Lviv-Przemyśl 
 Darnytsia-Kyiv-Odesa
 Kyiv-Dnipro-Zaporizhzhia
 Kyiv-Dnipro-Pokrovsk
 Kyiv-Kostiantynivka

Gallery

References

External links
 Ukraine express EMUs specifications at the Hyundai Rotem official website

Hyundai Rotem multiple units
Electric multiple units of Ukraine
Train-related introductions in 2012
3000 V DC multiple units
25 kV AC multiple units